Prospectors Mountain is a mountain in the Teton Range, located within Grand Teton National Park in the U.S. state of Wyoming. Prospectors Mountain rises to the south above Rimrock Lake and Death Canyon.

References

Mountains of Grand Teton National Park
Mountains of Wyoming
Mountains of Teton County, Wyoming